The 1889 Navy Midshipmen football team represented the United States Naval Academy during the 1889 college football season. The team compiled a 4–1–1 record and outscored opponents 112 to 42  In the ninth installment of the Johns Hopkins–Navy football rivalry, Navy lost by a 36 to 0 score.  The team captain was Albertus Catlin.

Schedule

References

Navy
Navy Midshipmen football seasons
Navy Midshipmen football